In Greek mythology, Elpis is the spirit of hope. She was depicted as a young woman, usually carrying flowers or a cornucopia in her hands.

Family 
Elpis is perhaps a child of Nyx and mother of Pheme, the goddess of fame, renown and rumor.

Mythology
In Hesiod's Works and Days, Elpis was the last item in Pandora's box (or jar). Based on Hesiod's description, the debate is still alive to determine if Elpis was only hope, or more generally expectation. Her equivalent in Roman mythology was Spes.

Hesiod's Works and Days
The more famous version of the Pandora myth comes from one of Hesiod's poems, Works and Days. In this version of the myth (lines 60–105), Hesiod expands upon her origin, and moreover widens the scope of the misery she inflicts on mankind. Pandora brings with her a jar containing "burdensome toil and sickness that brings death to men" (91–92), diseases (102) and "a myriad other pains" (100). Prometheus had – fearing further reprisals – warned his brother Epimetheus not to accept any gifts from Zeus. But Epimetheus did not listen; he accepted Pandora, who promptly scattered the contents of her jar. As a result, Hesiod tells us, "the earth and sea are full of evils" (101). One item, however, did not escape the jar (96–99), hope:

Only Hope was left within her unbreakable house,
she remained under the lip of the jar, and did not
fly away. Before [she could], Pandora replaced the
lid of the jar. This was the will of aegis-bearing
Zeus the Cloudgatherer.

Hesiod does not say why hope (elpis) remained in the jar. The implications of Elpis remaining in the jar were the subject of intense debate even in antiquity.

Hesiod closes with this moral (105): "Thus it is not possible to escape the mind of Zeus."

Namesakes
 Elpis was the name of a concubine of Herod the Great; her origins and fate are unknown.
 The asteroid 59 Elpis is named after her.
 Borderlands: The Pre-Sequel! takes place on Elpis, the moon of the fictional planet Pandora, setting of the previous Borderlands games.
 In Mega Man Zero 2, "Project Elpis" designates a former plan to exert control over all reploids to end the long-lasting war. However, much like the dubious interpretation the word bears in Greek mythology, the hope it was supposed to bring instead lengthens the war and spans all the events in the series. Similarly, the main antagonist also renames himself Elpis through intentions to better the world, but ends up extending the suffering. 
 Final Fantasy XIV: Endwalker features a flower named after Elpis that responds to emotional energy.

References
Notes

Citations

Bibliography

{{citation |last=Verdenius |first=Willem Jacob |author-link=Willem Jacob Verdenius |title=A Commentary on Hesiod Works and Days vv 1–382 |year=1985 |url=https://books.google.com/books?id=9Kk3AAAAIAAJ |publisher=E. J. Brill |isbn=90-04-07465-1}}

Further reading
West, M. L. Hesiod, Theogony, ed. with prolegomena and commentary (Oxford 1966).
West, M. L. Hesiod, Works and Days'', ed. with prolegomena and commentary (Oxford 1978).

External links

Godchecker (Greek Mythology) – Elpis

Greek goddesses
Personifications in Greek mythology